Kenneth Z. Altshuler (April 11, 1929 – January 6, 2021) was an American psychiatrist and psychoanalyst. He was a Professor Emeritus of Psychiatry and the Chairman of the Department of Psychiatry at the University of Texas Southwestern Medical Center in Dallas.

Early life and education 
Kenneth Z. Altshuler was born on April 11, 1929, in Paterson, New Jersey, to Jacob and Altie Altshuler. He graduated from Cornell University in 1948 and received his M.D. degree from the University at Buffalo, School of Medicine in 1952, at age 23. He did an internship at Kings County Hospital Center. From 1953–1955, he served in the Navy leaving the service with the rank of Lt. (J.G.) in the Medical Corps. After the military service, he underwent a specialty training in psychiatry and psychoanalysis at Columbia University Center for Psychoanalytic Training and Research.

Career 
In 1973, Altshuler joined the Columbia University faculty where he focused on the research of mental illnesses among deaf patients and in geriatric psychiatry. From 1973–1977, he managed undergraduate education in psychiatry at Columbia University's College of Physicians and Surgeons in New York. In 1977, he left Columbia University and moved to Texas. He became the chairman of the Department of Psychiatry at UT Southwestern Medical Center in Dallas. There, he expanded the faculty from five to over one hundred full-time physicians and raising fifty-two million dollars in departmental endowments, including funds for ten chairs and two research centers. He retired in 2019, and was appointed a Professor Emeritus of Psychiatry.

He served as a director of the National Board of Medical Examiners, as a president of the American Association of Chairs of Departments of Psychiatry in 1990–1991, as a board member and later, in 1996, a president of the American Board of Psychiatry and Neurology. In 1999, he was appointed to the board of the Texas Department of Mental Health and Mental Retardation, by then-Governor George W. Bush, and served for five years. He also served on the boards and advisory boards of the local psychiatric and charity organizations.

Personal life
He had three children from his first marriage, Steven L. Altshuler, Lori L. Altshuler and Dara Altshuler, and six grandchildren. In 1987, he married Ruth Collins Sharp, an American philanthropist. He and his wife were known for their civic engagement in Dallas and philanthropic activities in North Texas, including to UT Southwestern. After his wife died in 2017, he established a fund at UT Southwestern, the Ruth & Ken Altshuler Fund for Clinical Psychiatry and the Kenneth Z. Altshuler Fund for Psychiatric Education, to support clinical research and education programs related to mental illness.

Altshuler died from complications of COVID-19  on January 6, 2021, during the COVID-19 pandemic in Texas.

Awards and honors 

 Merit Award of the National Psychological Association for Psychoanalysis
 Honorary Doctorate of Science from the Gallaudet College for the Deaf
 Certificate of Special Achievement by the American Psychiatric Association for contribution to the program for the deaf in New York
 Certificate of Special Recognition by the American Psychiatric Association for contribution to the Community Mental Health program in Dallas
 Distinguished Alumnus Award of the University of Buffalo School of Medicine
 Trail Blazer Award by the Dallas Community Mental Health Center
 Wilson Award in Geriatric Psychiatry
 Psychiatric Excellence Award from the Texas Society of Psychiatric Physicians
 Texas Star Award from the Texas Mental Health Association
 Outstanding Psychiatric Award from the North Texas Society of Psychiatric Physicians
 Prism Award from the Dallas Mental Health Association
 The Psychiatric Out-Patient Clinic of Dallas Community Mental Health Center is named in his honor
 The Psychiatric Unit of Zale Lipshy Pavilion is named in his honor
 The Callier Center for Communication Disorders at University of Texas at Dallas established an annual award bearing his name – the Ruth and Ken Altshuler Callier Care Award
 The Metrocare Services established a research center bearing his name – the Altshuler Center for Education and Research
 Dallas County Mental Health and Mental Retardation renamed one of its clinics in his honor – the Kenneth Z. Altshuler Mental Health Clinic

See also 
 Ruth Sharp Altshuler
 Lori L. Altshuler

References 

1929 births
2021 deaths
People from Dallas
People from Paterson, New Jersey
Physicians from New Jersey
Physicians from Texas
Military personnel from New Jersey
American psychiatrists
Cornell University alumni
University at Buffalo alumni
Columbia University Vagelos College of Physicians and Surgeons alumni
University of Texas Southwestern Medical Center faculty
Sleep researchers
Deaths from the COVID-19 pandemic in Texas